The Thur is a river in the Haut-Rhin department, Alsace, France, left tributary of the river Ill. It rises in the Vosges Mountains, and flows through the towns Thann and Cernay. It flows into the Ill (a tributary of the Rhine) near Ensisheim, north of Mulhouse.

References

Rivers of France
Rivers of Grand Est
Rivers of Haut-Rhin